John W. Darrah (December 11, 1938 – March 23, 2017) was a United States district judge of the United States District Court for the Northern District of Illinois.

Education and career

Born in Chicago, Illinois, Darrah received a Bachelor of Science degree from Loyola University Chicago in 1965 and a Juris Doctor from Loyola University Chicago School of Law in 1969. He was an attorney advisor for the Federal Trade Commission from 1969 to 1971. He was a deputy public defender in the DuPage County Public Defender Office from 1971 to 1973. He was in private practice in Illinois from 1971 to 1973. He also began teaching as an adjunct professor in the Northern Illinois University College of Law in 1972. He was an Assistant state's attorney of Office of State's Attorney, Illinois from 1973 to 1976. He was in private practice in Illinois from 1976 to 1986. He was a Circuit court judge of the Illinois 18th Judicial Circuit Court from 1986 to 2000. He was instrumental in establishing Keith Roberts Trial Advocacy Program that the Du Page County Bar Association has been putting on for lawyers since about 1995 – a program that concluded one on its programs on March 18, 2017, just days before his death.

Federal judicial service

On May 11, 2000, Darrah was nominated by President Bill Clinton to a seat on the United States District Court for the Northern District of Illinois vacated by George Michael Marovich. Darrah was confirmed by the United States Senate on June 30, 2000, and received his commission on July 14, 2000. He continued to teach as an adjunct professor at The John Marshall Law School, teaching evidence and trial advocacy. He assumed senior status on March 1, 2017, serving in that status until his death on March 23, 2017, at his residence in Lisle, Illinois.

References

Sources

1938 births
2017 deaths
Illinois state court judges
Judges of the United States District Court for the Northern District of Illinois
United States district court judges appointed by Bill Clinton
Loyola University Chicago School of Law alumni
Northern Illinois University faculty
Public defenders
Lawyers from Chicago
20th-century American judges
21st-century American judges